Corona is a genus of air-breathing land snails, terrestrial pulmonate gastropod mollusks in the family Orthalicidae.

Snails in this genus are restricted in range to central and northern South America. These snails have medium to large elongated shells.

Species
Species within the genus Corona include:

 Corona atramentarius (Pfeiffer, 1855)
 Corona incisa (Hupé, 1857) (synonym: Bulimus incisus Hupé, 1857)
 Corona loroisiana (Hupé, 1857)
 Corona perversa (Swainson, 1820)
 Corona pfeifferi (Hidalgo, 1869)
 Corona regalis (Hupé, 1857)
 Corona regina (Férussac, 1821)
 Corona regius (Férussac)
 Corona ribeiroi Ihering, 1915
 Corona rosenbergi Strebel, 1909

References

Orthalicidae